Maudood Chishti (also known as Qutubuddin, Shams Sufiyaan and Chiraag Chishtiyaan) was an early day Sufi Saint, a successor to his father and master Abu Yusuf Bin Saamaan, twelfth link in the Sufi silsilah of Chishti Order, and the Master of Shareef Zandani. He was born around 430 Hijri in the city of Chisht. He initially received education from his father. He memorized the Qur'an by age 7 and completed his education when he was 16. His work includes two books, Minhaaj ul Arifeen and Khulaasat ul Shariah. He died in the month of Rajab at the age of 97 in 533 AH (March 1139 CE). He was buried at Chisht like many of the early Chishtiyya.

Tasawuf 
Khwaja Al Mawdud Chisti became the mureed of Khwaja Nasir Abu Yusuf Bin Saamaan Chisti. After he became a mureed, his murshid (Master) addressed him by saying, "O Qutubuddin Mowdud, adopt the path of the Faqr." The word "faqr" is literally translated as "poverty", but in the language of tasawwuf, it means to be rich with Allah. 

It is for one to have total trust in Allah and not to be dependent on any other than Allah. Faqar is the way of true dervishes. Khwaja Mawdud Al Chisti accepted his murshids (spiritual guidance) advice. Shortly thereafter he went into seclusion and remained absorbed in worship for twenty years. During this period, he rarely ate and was reported to complete two recitations of the Quran during the day and two during the night. He also used to constantly make the zikr of La Ilaha Illallah.

Khwaja Maudood's Khalifa 
Khwaja Mawdud Chishti visited Balkh (the place of birth of Jalaluddin Rumi) and Bukhara, a place mentioned in the famous line of Hafez, "If that Turk of Shiraz would take my heart in his hand, I would give for his Hindu mole both Bukhara and Samarkand." Khwaja Haji Sharif Zindani, his successor, renounced everything. He led a life of strict seclusion for 40 years and hated society. He used to live on leaves of trees. Although several of the Chishtiyya stressed the value of asceticism, in general they said that seclusion and ascetic practice was for short periods only. Live in the midst of society rather than keep your spiritual ideals. It is said that the followers of Khwaja Qutubuddin were around 10,000, not including close friends and allies. It is impossible to enumerate Khwaja Mawdud's Khulafa. For the sake of barakat, a few are mentioned hereunder.

Among them the link in this (CHISTI) Silsila is Khwaja Shareef Zindani. That is why his message spread. His influence spread west to Khurasan, Iraq, Syria, Hijaz, and Tihamah and in the south to Iran, Siestan and the subcontinent. In the west, his message was spread by the likes of Sharif Zindani and Khwaja Usman Harooni. Khwaja Qutubuddin was 29 when his father died and he inherited the throne. He never visited the rich or went to the royal courts. He was a simple man who led a simple life. He was always courteous to the needs of others. He always was the first to greet people and respected everyone.

Books 
Chisti's works include two books, Minhaaj ul Areifeen and Khulaasat ul Shariah.

Sayings 
. The lover of sama' (Sufi music) is a stranger to the outside world, but is a friend to God.
. The mysteries of sama' are inexplicable. If you reveal them you are liable to punishment.

Miracles 
 Moulana Zakariyah says: "Khwajah Maudood Chisti acquired the capabilities known as Kash-e-Quloob (revelations of the conditions of the hearts) and Kashf-e-Quboor (revelation of the conditions of the graves)."
 Whenever Khwaja Maudood Chishti wanted to see the Ka'aba, he could see it even though he was in Chisht.
 Khwaja Qutbuddin Maudood Chishti's dead body flew in the air on its way to the graveyard. Khwaja Fareeduddin Ganj Shakar upon narrating this fell unconscious.

Descendants
Khwaja Maudood Chishti's son Khwaja Najamuddin Ahmed Ahmed Mushtaq Bin Moudod Chishti was buried at Chisht. Syed Abul Alla Moudodi was a descendant of his who was born at Aurangabad India in 1903 Hijri. Many of his descendants live in the area. Khwaja Wali Kirani Moudodi Chishti Kirani and Khwaja Mir Shahdad Moudodi Chishti Kirani are also Khwaja Maudood Chishti's descendants. The tombs of both these famous saints are in a place called Kirani, west of Quetta city. A large number of his descendants still live in Kirani. Khwaja Ibrahim Yukpasi another important saint belonging to Khwaja Maudood Chishti's family is buried in Mastung Balochistan and Khwaja Dopassi is buried in Dhadar near the beginning of Bolan pass Balochistan Pakistan

Descendants Khwaja Qutubuddin Mohammad Thani Chishti migrated to Sindh Old Bukkhar (near Shahdadkot). One of this family descendants named Khwaja Assadullah Kunjnashin Bukkhari migrated to Nawada-Gaya areas of Bihar, India. His followers preached Islam and guided the Muslims there. Khwaja Abdullah Chishti and Taj Mahmood Haqqani Chishti were the Sufi saints of Chishti order and direct descendants of Maudood Chishti's son. Their shrines are situated in Milkitola Chhota Sheikhpura, Narhat block near Hisua (GPRS 24 83N 85 43E)

Descendant Khwaja Nizam-ud-din Alli's tomb is in the vicinity of Pishin city of Balochistan in a place called Minziki, home for many other descendants. Khwaja Naqruddin Chishti Moudodi (Shaal Pir Baba) is another descendant whose tomb is in Balochistan, located in Quetta chaowni near the old fort. In the valley of shal kot (Quetta) and Bolan in the Balochistan province the influence of the Moudodi family reached within the lifetime of the head of the family. According to one source Khwaja Qutubuddin Moudod visited the area at least once. He came to the home of his follower Shiekh Babut in the area of Shoroak. Shiekh Babut belonged to the pashtoon tribe called 'Bariech'. During the lifetime of Khwaja Moudod Chishti his friends and followers started to spread the message of Islam. Later on Khwaja Qutubuddin Moudod Chishti's own family (the sadat) advanced the message of Islam in greater Balochistan and molded the life of ordinary people according to the ideology of Islam.

 (16) –  Syed Khwaja Qutubuddin Maudood Chishti in Chisht Hirat Afghanistan.(B430h D527h)
 (18) –  Syed Rukun ud din Khwaja Hussain Chishti in Chisht Hirat Afghanistan.(B545h D635h)
 (19) –  Syed Qud ud din Khwaja Mohammad in Chisht Hirat Afghanistan. (B584h D624h)
 (20) –  Syed Khwaja Qutubuddin Ibn Khwaja Muhammed (B602h D680h)
 (21) –  Syed Aud ud din Khwaja Abu Ahmed Syed Muhammed in Chisht Hirat Afghanistan. (B635h D710h)
 (22) –  Syed Taqi ud din Khwaja Yusuf in Chisht Hirat Afghanistan. (B662h D745h)
 (23) –  Syed Nassar ud din Khwaja Waleed in Chisht Hirat Afghanistan. (B727h D820h)
 Shaal Pir Baba — Syed Shaal Pir Baba Chishti Moudodi. Quetta.
 (24) –  Syed Khwaja Wali Kirani Moudodi Chishti in Kirani Quetta Balouchistan Pakistan.
 (25) –  Syed Khwaja Mir Shahdad Moudodi Chishti in Kirani Quetta Balouchistan Pakistan.

Descendant Maulana Sayyid Shah Faseeh Ahmad Asthanvi (1904-1969) lived in Asthawan Nalanda. He Studied in Darul Uloom Deoband and was among the students of Anwar Shah Kashmiri. He was an expert in Arabic and Persian Literature, and wrote poems primarily in Arabic. A collection of articles written on him along with his biography compiled by Shakeel Asthanvi named Tazkira e Fasih Ahmad Bihari has been published and released on 28th of February 2023 in a Public Gathering titled as Islaah e Muaashra organised in Madrasa Faseeh ul Banaat.

Descendant Maulana Sayyid Shah Moazzam Hussain Qasmi lived in Patna, Bihar. He was younger Brother of Maulana Sayyid Shah Faseeh Ahmad Asthanvi . He graduated from Darul Uloom Deoband and was Teacher at Madrasa Islamia Shamsul Hoda Patna. He was also a poet and primarily wrote in Urdu.

Shijra-e-tareekat
Main source:

 Muhammad
 Ali
Early Sufis who, though not part of a formal order, are part of the spiritual chain:
Hasan al-Basri  (died 110 AH)
Abdul Waahid Bin Zaid  (died 176 AH)
Fudhail Bin Iyadh  (died 187 AH)
Ibrahim Bin Adham  (died 162 AH)
Ḥudhayfa al-Marʿashī  (died 202 AH)
Abū Hubayra al-Baṣrī  (died 287 AH)
Mumshad Dinawari  (died 298 AH)
Start of the Chishti Order:
Abu Ishaq Shami  (died 329 AH)
Abu Ahmad Abdal  (died 355 AH)
Abu Muhammad Bin Abi Ahmad  (died 411 AH)
Abu Yusuf Bin Saamaan  (died 459 AH)
Maudood Chishti (died 527 AH)
Shareef Zandani
Usman Harooni
Moinuddin Chishti
Qutbuddin Bakhtiar Kaki
Fariduddin Ganjshakar
After Fariduddin Ganjshakar the Chishti Order in Hind (India/South Asia) split into two branches i.e. the Chishti-Nizami founded by Nizamuddin Auliya and the Chishti-Sabri founded by Alauddin Sabir Kaliyari.

Family tree

(1) – Imam Ali ibn Abu Talib Amir al-Mu'minin Buried at the Imam Ali Mosque in Najaf, Iraq. {March 17, 599 — February 28, 661 aged 61}
(2) –  Imam Husayn ibn Ali Sayed al- — Buried at the Imam Husayn Shrine in Karbala, Iraq. (B4h D60h)
(3) –  Imam Ali ibn Husayn al-Sajjad, Zayn al-ʿĀbidin Buried in Jannat al-Baqi Medina. (B-h D94h)
(4) –  Imam Muhammad ibn Ali al-Baqir al-Ulum Buried in Jannat al Baqi Medina. (B-h D114h)
(5) –  Imam Ja'far al-Sadiq al-Sadiq — in Jannat al-Baqi Medina. (B80h D148h)
(6) –  Imam Musa al-Kadhimal-Kazim in the Kadhimiya in Baghdad Iraq. (B128h D183h)
(7) –  Imam Ali ibn Musa al-Rida, Reza in the Imam Reza shrine Mashad. (B153h D203h)
(8) –  Imam Muhammad ibn Ali al-Taqi, al-Jawad in the Kadhimiya in Baghdad, Iraq. (B195h D220h)
(9) –  Imam Ali al-Hadi al-Hadi, al-Naqi in the Al Askari Mosque in Samarra Iraq. (B214h D254h)
(10) – Syed Imam Abdullah Ali Akbar bin Hasan al Askari. (B238h D292h)
(11) –  Syed Imam Syed Abu Muhammed Al Hussain in Chist Hirat present Afghanistan. (B—h D352h)
(12) –  Syed Abu Abdullah Muhammed in Chisht Hirat present Afghanistan. (B270h D324h)
(13) –  Syed Abu Jaffer Ibrahim in Chisht Hirat present Afghanistan. (B-h D370h)
(14) –  Syed Shams-ud-din Abu Nassar Muhammed Saman in Chisht Hirat present Afghanistan. (B-h D398h)
(15) –  Syed Khwaja Abu Yusuf Bin Saamaan Nasir-ud-din Abu Yusuf Bin Saamaan in Chisht Hirat present Afghanistan. (B375h D459h)
(16) – Syed Khwaja Qutubuddin Maudood Chishti in Chisht Hirat Afghanistan. (B430h D527h)

(Referenced from the book: Khwaja Ibrahim Yakpassi Chishti)
 Imam Ali al Murtaza
 Imam Hasan al Mujtaba
 Hasan al Muthanna
 Abdullah al Mahd
 Hasan
 Majad ul Muali
 Hasan
 Yahya
 Ibrahim
 Sultan Farghana
 Abu Ahmed Abdal
 Amatullah 
 Nasruddin Abu Yusuf
 Qutbuddin Mawdud

Images

See also
 Khwaja Ibrahim Yukpasi

Notes

Bibliography

References
 The Big Five of India in Sufism 
 Pakistan, a Political Study 
 A Guide to the Islamic Movement 

 Tazkara-e-Syed Moudodi, idara-e-maarife Islam, Mansoora Lahore
 Sair-ul-aolia, Urdu and Persian edition, written by Amir Khurd
 Maraat-ul-israr by Khwaja Abdul Rehman Chishti Quds Sira
 Trirekh-e-mashaikh-e-Chisht by Doctor inam-ul-Haq
 Safinat-ul-Arifeen
 Tazkara-e-Ghuas o Qutub
 Shijra-e-Maoroosi Sadat Kirani
 The Origin Of Chishti Order
Tazkira e Fasih Ahmad Bihari 1139 deaths 11th-century births Iranian Muslim mystics Chishtis Sufi saints Sufi religious leaders Chishti Order